Suppan is a surname. It may refer to:
Sigismund Suppan (1814–1881), bishop of Banská Bystrica
Arnold Suppan (1945–), Austrian historian
Jeff Suppan (1975–), American pitcher
Gernot Suppan (1985–), Austrian footballer

See also